Ion Haidu was a Romanian athlete. He competed in the men's decathlon at the 1928 Summer Olympics.

References

External links
 

Year of birth missing
Possibly living people
Athletes (track and field) at the 1928 Summer Olympics
Romanian decathletes
Olympic athletes of Romania
Place of birth missing